The Meiteism or the Meeteism is a term used to describe the original animistic religious belief system of the Meitei ethnicity in particular. It refers to the pre-Hindu faith of the Meitei ethnic group. It incorporates various teachings from the Meitei scriptures. Meiteism is a large facet of the collective synthesis of believes known as Sanamahism.
Though Meiteism is treated as another name of Sanamahism, the later term has wider coverage of the traditional beliefs and practices of the hill tribesman communities also. The term was used during the Meitei revivalism movement to promote the ethnic religion of the Meitei people explicitly.
In every Meitei household, there is a sacred abode of God Sanamahi, called the Sanamahi Kachin. It is an analogous term to Koshinto being used as a term for primitive Shinto in contrast with the current established tradition

See Also 

 Koshinto

Other websites

References 

Sanamahism
Pages with unreviewed translations